"Fragile Bird" is the first single from City and Colour's third studio album, Little Hell.

Charts

Popular culture

Sports
The song was used for Hockey Night in Canada's intro for game seven of the 2011 Stanley Cup Finals between the Vancouver Canucks and Boston Bruins.

References

External links

2011 singles
City and Colour songs
2011 songs
Songs written by Dallas Green (musician)
Dine Alone Records singles